Jackie Davis may refer to:

 Jackie Davis (1920–1999), American soul jazz singer, organist and bandleader
 Jackie Davis (writer) (born 1963), New Zealand author and poet